The flag of the Kyrgyz Republic consists of a red field charged with a yellow sun that contains a depiction of a tunduk, the opening in the center of the roof of a yurt (traditional nomadic tent). It is actually a depiction of the first thing one sees when waking up in a yurt, namely the construction of the pinnacle of every Kyrgyz yurt with three  crisscrossing laths across the circular opening at the top of the yurt. Adopted in 1992, just over seven months after the country's independence was declared, to replace the flag of the Kirghiz Soviet Socialist Republic (SSR), it has been the flag of the Kyrgyz Republic since that year. The red on the flag is said to be inspired by the pennant lifted by Manas, the country's folk hero.

History
Kyrgyz rebels wielded white banners (named "White Banner of National Liberation") during the Andijan uprising of 1898. Later, during the Central Asian revolt of 1916, they used it again during an uprising in Jizzakh and during an attack on Prebechakenska.

Under Soviet rule, the Union Republic — coterminous with modern-day Kyrgyzstan — utilized a flag derived from the flag of the Soviet Union and representing Communism, that was adopted in 1953.  It declared itself independent on 31 August 1991, approximately four months before the dissolution of the Soviet Union.  Nevertheless, the Soviet-era flag maintained its status as the national flag for seven months after independence was declared.  It was finally replaced by the current design on 3 March 1992, one day after Kyrgyzstan was admitted to the United Nations along with seven other post-Soviet states.

Design

Symbolism

The colors and symbols of the flag carry cultural, political, and regional meanings.  The red field stands for "bravery and valor", and alludes to the purported emblem hoisted by Manas, the national hero of Kyrgyzstan.  The sun epitomizes peace and prosperity, while its 40 rays stand for the number of tribes united by Manas to fight against the Mongols, as well as the number of followers he had.

The centre of the sun features a stylized illustration of the roof (tunduk) atop a traditional Kyrgyz tent (yurt) when viewed from the interior.  Although these tents are less commonly used today, its incorporation into the flag is meant to symbolize the "origin of life", the "unity of time and space", as well as the people's "hearth and home" and their history.

Proposals to change
In recent years, a commission was established to examine proposals to modify the design of the flag.  The head of this body observed how it was the object of conflict and disunity,  and that the government did not want this national symbol to be the cause of further division in society.  This partially stemmed from disagreement over the interpretation of the symbols on the current flag.  For instance, modern-day Kyrgyzstan is ethnically diverse, with sizeable minority groups such as the Uzbeks (14.3%) and Dungans (1.1%) living there.  These groups were historically conquered by Manas, and hence, the current flag – inspired by his emblem utilized in war – does not sit well with some of them.

The red field has also been the source of much criticism.  Some believe that it evokes the nation's tempestuous history, while others are of the opinion that it is a lingering remnant of communism in the country.

Colours scheme

Regional flags
Each region (областы, oblasty or облусу, oblusu) of Kyrgyzstan has its own flag.

City flags

Other flags

See also
 Flag of the Kirghiz SSR
 Importance of forty among Turkic people

References

External links

 
 Kyrgyzstan – Vexillographia

Flags introduced in 1992
Flag
Flags of Asia
Kyrgyzstan
Flags of Kyrgyzstan
1992 establishments in Kyrgyzstan